Situation: Critical is Ultra Naté's third album, released on Strictly Rhythm in 1998. The album and especially its lead single, "Free", has become her most successful work of music in the mainstream pop world on both sides of the Atlantic so far. "Found a Cure" and "New Kind of Medicine" were also hit singles.
As of July 1999, the album sold 150,000 units in the U.S., according to Nielsen SoundScan.

Track listing

Charts

References

External links
Ultra Naté - Situation: Critical

1998 albums
Ultra Naté albums